Riverside Depot is a former train station in Riverside, California.

History
The station was constructed in 1904 by the San Pedro, Los Angeles and Salt Lake Railroad along their route to Los Angeles. Union Pacific Railroad acquired the line on Vine Street along with the station in 1921. Local Pacific Electric streetcars served the station via a terminal at 7th and Vine until 1924. Passenger service ceased in 1971 when Amtrak took over intercity passenger service in the United States. The final trips of the City of Los Angeles serving the station were on April 30 eastbound and May 2 westbound.

The depot was listed on the National Register of Historic Places on April 18, 1977 as San Pedro, Los Angeles, & Salt Lake RR Depot. Metrolink commuter rail service to Riverside began in 1993, followed by Amtrak in 2002; both use Riverside–Downtown station near the former Santa Fe Railroad station.

References

Buildings and structures in Riverside, California
Railway stations in Riverside County, California
Railway stations in the United States opened in 1904
Railway stations closed in 1971
National Register of Historic Places in Riverside County, California
Railway stations on the National Register of Historic Places in California
1900s architecture in the United States
1904 establishments in California
Former Union Pacific Railroad stations in California
Los Angeles and Salt Lake Railroad